Kjerknesvågen is a village in the municipality of Inderøy in Trøndelag county, Norway.

The village features a general store and a harbour.  Located a few kilometers to the east is Lyngstad School that serves as an elementary school.  The harbour is known for its annual Båttreff, a marine fair including a regatta.  The dominant industry around the village is farming.

References

Villages in Trøndelag
Inderøy